Keith Miller was a member of Donald Bradman's famous Australian cricket team, which toured England in 1948 and went undefeated in its 34 matches. This unprecedented feat by a Test side touring England earned the Australians the sobriquet "The Invincibles". Miller was an all-rounder: a right-arm opening fast bowler and a right-handed middle-order batsman. With Ray Lindwall, he formed Australia's first-choice opening attack, a combination regarded as one of the best of all time. Miller was also a skillful slip fielder, regarded by his captain as the best in the world.

Miller played a vital role in the side's success in the Test series, particularly with the ball. Despite a back injury which meant he passed one Test without bowling, he took 13 wickets in the series at an average of 26.28, and also contributed 184 runs at an average of 23.15. He played a key role in subduing England's leading batsmen, Len Hutton and Denis Compton, with a barrage of short-pitched bowling, troubling Hutton to such an extent that he was dropped for the Third Test. In all first-class matches on the tour, Miller scored 1,088 runs at 47.30 and took 56 wickets at 17.58. Bradman gave him a light bowling workload during the tour matches, to keep him fresh for the Test matches.

Miller's character, joie de vivre and love of cricket were expressed on the field during the tour, particularly in the tour games, when he played several carefree innings, hitting many sixes. He also showed his disdain for Bradman's obsession with annihilating the opposition. In one match against Essex, he deliberately allowed himself to be bowled first ball in protest against Australia's ruthless approach to batting; that day, his side set a world record for the most runs scored in a day of first-class cricket (721).

Miller's charisma—coupled with the unprecedented popularity of the Australians—meant that he was in demand at social events on the tour. His friendship with Princess Margaret was also particularly scrutinised by the media.

Background

Miller had played for Australia in every Test match since the resumption of international cricket after World War II. A specialist batsman before the war, he emerged as a frontline fast bowler during the Victory Tests, a series of friendly games between England and Australia in 1945. He made his official Test debut against New Zealand in early 1946. Since the Test series against England during the 1946–47 Australian summer, he had opened the bowling with Ray Lindwall and played as a frontline batsman, usually at number five in the batting order. Miller played a leading role in Australia's 3–0 victory over the hosts in that series. He finished at the top of the Australian Test bowling averages with 16 wickets at 20.88, and was second in the batting averages, scoring 384 runs at 76.80. In particular, his pace and intimidating bouncers had troubled England's leading batsmen, Len Hutton and Denis Compton. He dismissed Hutton thrice and took the wicket of his opening partner Cyril Washbrook twice. In addition to scoring his maiden Test century in the series, Miller also hit three scores over 150 for his state, Victoria; his runs were scored at a rapid pace and featured many powerful shots.

Miller had a light workload in the 1947–48 home Test series against India, which Australia won 4–0; his teammates often finished off the opposition before he had an opportunity, particularly with the bat. He was required to bat just once in each Test, accumulating 185 runs at 37.00, including two half-centuries. His 72 overs yielded nine wickets at 24.78. Lindwall and Miller were selected by captain Donald Bradman and his fellow selectors for the 1948 tour of England as the intended new ball pairing.

Early tour
Miller and his teammates arrived in Southampton in April after a sea voyage from Australia aboard the SS Strathaird. Following the custom for their tours of England, Australia fielded its first-choice team in the traditional opening game against Worcestershire. Miller was selected and started the "Invincibles" tour strongly. He scored a hard-hitting 50 not out, with five fours and a six, after coming in to bat at No. 9. He bowled 20 overs in the game for figures of 1/54, and Australia completed an innings victory.

The tour opener was followed by a game against Leicestershire; Miller was promoted to No. 3. At the fall of the first wicket, the crowd surged towards the players' gate, expecting Bradman to enter in his customary batting position. Miller emerged instead, and scored an unbeaten 202 in five and a half hours, although he was dropped three times. He featured in a 111-run second wicket partnership with Sid Barnes, before putting on 159 with Bradman for the third wicket. After a late-order collapse, in which no other batsman passed 12, it was left to last man Bill Johnston to partner Miller from 180 onwards. The pair put on 37 for the tenth wicket before Johnston was out for 12, allowing Miller to complete a double century. One of his sixes concussed a spectator. After his long innings, Miller did not bowl in the first innings, but was used late in the second innings and took 2/10. Australia completed another innings triumph.

The next match was against Yorkshire, for whom Hutton played; it gave both Miller and Hutton an opportunity to gain a psychological advantage before the Tests. In cold and blustery conditions, Miller reduced his pace and bowled medium-paced off breaks, operating throughout most of the innings and taking 6/42 in 23.3 overs. He removed Hutton for five after the Yorkshireman had struggled for an hour in the middle. Yorkshire were all out for 71 on a wet wicket. In reply, Australia scored just 101; Miller scored a counter-attacking 34, the highest individual score in the match. He hit two sixes in his innings, including one from the first ball that he faced. He then took 3/49 in the second innings as Yorkshire were all out for 89 to leave Australia a victory target of 60. He was dismissed for two, caught at long off after attempting to hit a six from the spin of Johnny Wardle to leave Australia 3/13. The remaining batsmen struggled and Australia lost six wickets before scoring the winning runs; this was the closest the team came to defeat on the whole tour, and Miller's performance in the match was instrumental in preserving the unbeaten record.

After three consecutive three-day matches, which involved playing in nine days out of ten, Miller sat out the next match against Surrey at The Oval, which Australia won by an innings. He returned to take seven wickets in the next fixture against Cambridge University. In the first innings, he resumed his battle with John Dewes, whom he had troubled during the Victory Tests in 1945. This time, Dewes put a thick towel under his shirt for protection against an anticipated short-pitched barrage; instead, Miller followed a short ball with a yorker to dismiss him. He then took the last three wickets to end with 5/46 as the hosts were bowled out for 167 in the first innings. Miller was not required to bat as Australia amassed 4/414 declared then took 2/29 as his team completed an innings victory.

The next match was against Essex. Australia, having elected to bat, had reached 2/364 when Miller came out to bat midway through the first day, after Bradman and Bill Brown had scored 219 runs for the second wicket in 90 minutes. Miller took guard and deliberately let his first ball, from Trevor Bailey, hit the stumps, much to Bradman's displeasure. Miller later said that he was making a protest against the one-sided nature of the contest; Australia went on to score 721 runs on the first day, a record number of runs in a single day of first-class cricket. The former Australian Test batsman Jack Fingleton, who covered the Australian tour as a journalist, said: "Under the circumstances at Southend, I could well understand his [Miller's] feelings". When he bowled, Miller took Essex's first three wickets to reduce the hosts to 3/13, and ended with 3/14 in their total of 83. He bowled just two overs, without taking any more wickets, when Bradman enforced the follow on; Australia won by an innings and 451 runs, its largest winning margin for the season. Bradman rested Miller for the next game against Oxford University, which Australia won by an innings.

In the lead-up to the Tests, Australia took on the Marylebone Cricket Club (MCC) at Lord's. Bradman's men batted first, and Miller came to the crease at 3/200. Sharing partnerships of 80 runs for the fourth wicket with Lindsay Hassett, 63 for the fifth with Brown and 155 with Ian Johnson for the sixth, Miller scored 163 runs in 250 minutes, hitting 20 fours and three sixes. The Australians hit nine sixes off the off spin bowling of Jim Laker on the second morning of the match in an attempt to establish their mastery of him before the Test series. After Miller's dismissal, Australia were out for 552. With the ball, Miller and Lindwall attempted to maintain their ascendancy over Hutton, who was playing for MCC. On this occasion, he scored 52 and 64, but MCC were defeated by an innings and 158 runs. Miller had figures of 3/28 and 1/37. He dismissed England Test batsman Bill Edrich, who had been a prolific scorer in recent English seasons, and was expected to be one of the key batsmen in the forthcoming Ashes series. Miller twice took the wicket of Jack Robertson, who was thought to be in contention for England selection; after two low scores against Miller, he was overlooked. In addition to his performance on the field, Miller solved some off-field problems. The MCC—which administered cricket at the time—provided him with legal assistance in his contract dispute with Rawtenstall Cricket Club. The Australian all-rounder had signed a contract to play for the club in the Lancashire League, but failed to honour it. Rawtenstall dropped the dispute after being offered compensation.

Miller was rested for the next match against Lancashire, which was drawn after the first day was lost to rain. He returned against Nottinghamshire and scored 51 of Australia's total of 400. Miller took a wicket in each innings, including that of Test batsman Reg Simpson, to end with 2/67 as Australia drew its second consecutive match. In the next match, against Hampshire, Miller bowled 19 overs without reward, taking 0/39 as the home team batted first and scored 195. In reply, Australia was in trouble after rain turned the pitch into a sticky wicket. Miller came in at 2/38 and launched a counter-attack, scoring 39 of the 53 runs added before he fell with the score at 5/91. The Australians were all out for 117, conceding a first innings lead of 78, the first time during the tour that they had been behind on the first innings. Miller's top score of 39 included three consecutive sixes from the bowling of Charlie Knott, who took 5/57. In Hampshire's second innings, he took 5/25 and bowled three of his victims. The tourists dismissed Hampshire for 103, leaving a target of 182, which Australia achieved with eight wickets to spare without Miller having to bat. He was rested for the match against Sussex at Hove, after six consecutive days of cricket. In its last match before the Tests, Australia completed an innings victory in just two days.

First Test

Before the Tests, Fingleton expected the English batsmen to struggle against Miller and Lindwall; he believed that, accustomed to prolific scoring against low-quality bowling in county cricket, these batsmen would be unable to adapt to the demands of facing world-class opposition. England won the toss and batted first on the opening morning of the First Test at Trent Bridge. There had been overnight rain, which meant that the pitch would initially be favourable towards fast bowlers. Opening the bowling with Lindwall, Miller induced an edge from Washbrook in his first over, but it went to ground. In his second over, Miller bowled Hutton with a faster ball, leaving England at 1/9. In his second over, Miller bowled Hutton for three with a faster ball that skidded off the pitch to leave England at 9/1. The journalist and former Australian Test leg spinner Bill O'Reilly criticised Hutton for not moving his leg across to the pitch of the ball, thereby leaving a gap between bat and pad, but praised Miller for his ability to make occasional deliveries skid on faster, surprising the batsman.

Miller beat Washbrook's bat twice in one over soon after lunch, but was unable to extract an edge. Miller held a catch—described by Wisden as "dazzling"—when Joe Hardstaff junior edged Johnston into the slips and was out for a duck. Two runs later, he bowled Compton, who was attempting a leg sweep. As a result, half the English team were out with only 48 runs on the board after 100 minutes of play. England fell to 8/74, but recovered with an 89-run ninth-wicket partnership between Alec Bedser and Laker. Miller ended the innings by removing Laker—caught behind for 63—leaving England all out for 165. The paceman ended with 3/38 from 19 overs.

On the second day, Miller came in at 2/121—O'Reilly believed that Bradman was trying to force the pace and had promoted Miller above Lindsay Hassett, the usual number four batsman—and was dismissed for a duck; he failed to pick Laker's arm ball, which went straight on instead of turning in, clipped the outside edge and was taken at slip by Edrich. After Australia finished at 509 on the third day to take a 344-run lead, Miller opened the bowling with Johnston—Lindwall was injured while bowling in the first innings and was unable to take to the field. Miller removed Washbrook for one, caught behind by Tallon from a top-edged hook shot. Washbrook was displeased with the decision and gestured to a red mark on his shirt, indicating his opinion that the ball hit his clothing rather than the bat.

Miller continued his battle with Hutton and Compton, although he resorted to bowling off spin from a shorter run to conserve energy late in the day. Hutton hit three fours in quick succession from Miller's bowling to reach his fifty. The paceman responded to the spate of boundaries by reverting to pace and bowling a series of bouncers, including five in the last over of the day. One of these struck Hutton high on his left (front) arm. The batsmen survived, but the bowler received a hostile reaction from the crowd throughout his barrage of short-pitched bowling. Some of the spectators shouted "Bodyline". Miller appeared to be amused by the crowd reaction and revelled in it, grinning and flicking his hair. Hutton responded by glancing Miller for a four from the final ball of the day. England were 2/121 at stumps on the third day, with Hutton and Compton still at the crease. Miller was jeered and heckled as he left the field at the end of play. The crowd surged towards him as he walked up the steps into the dressing room, but there was no altercation. O'Reilly later defended Miller's use of short-pitched deliveries, pointing out that his field settings were less intimidatory than those of Bodyline.

After a rest day on the Sunday of the game, England resumed on Monday with England still 223 runs in arrears. The Nottinghamshire secretary H. A. Brown broadcast an appeal to the spectators via the public address system, urging them to refrain from barracking Miller. In response, they clapped when the Australians took to the field. The chairman of Nottinghamshire reportedly apologised to Bradman in private regarding the crowd reaction to Miller. Taking the new ball in the fifth over of the day, in the overcast conditions that morning, Miller bowled a relatively full length, rather than bouncers, and swung the ball; one of his deliveries beat Hutton and narrowly missed his stumps. Shortly after a break for bad light, he bowled Hutton with an off cutter. This brought in Hardstaff, who was dropped from his third delivery by Arthur Morris at slip. In the remainder of the over, Hardstaff played and missed, then edged two further balls; the second edge went for four runs through the slips. During the morning session, Bradman used Miller for 11 overs in a row to pressurise the Englishmen.

Another catch went down off Miller late in the day when Compton, who had reached a century, edged him but Johnson dropped the catch at slip. Charlie Barnett then edged Johnston into the slips, where Miller completed a difficult catch. Compton then hit Miller for four, provoking the paceman's first bouncer of the day. Compton hooked it away for two and the next delivery slipped out of Miller's hand and cleared the batsman's head on the full, provoking some jeering in the crowd. England reached stumps at 6/345, just one run ahead of the tourists, with Compton on 154.

The next day, Compton was out hit wicket for 184 when he tried unsuccessfully to avoid a bouncer from Miller. Fingleton described the dismissal as "a most depressing end to an innings that will live always". Australia quickly finished off the hosts' innings; Miller bowled Laker for four, before England reached 441, leaving Australia with a victory target of 98 in three hours. Miller ended with 4/125 for the innings and 7/163 for the match, having removed England's two leading batsmen in both innings and bowled 63 overs—more than his usual workload—because Lindwall was injured. As the players were walking back to the pavilion after England's innings, Miller received another hostile reception. One spectator threatened him with violence, prompting the Australian to grab him by his coat collar, challenging him to enter the Australian dressing room. The spectator declined. Miller was not required to bat as Australia went on to win by eight wickets.

After the heavy bowling workload at Trent Bridge, Bradman rested Miller for the innings win against Northamptonshire, which started the day after the Test. Miller returned for another match against Yorkshire, albeit with a lighter bowling load. He scored 20 in the first innings and made a duck in the second. Nevertheless, he opened the bowling in the first innings with the intention of keeping the pressure on Hutton, although he did not dismiss him in this game. The paceman was barracked by the spectators, who shouted "What about Larwood" in response to the repeated short-pitched bowling during his six wicketless overs. Bradman spared Miller from bowling in the second innings because of a back complaint, attempting to preserve him for the Second Test.

Second Test

The Second Test match was held at Lord's, but Miller was still unable to bowl when it began. He came in to bat in the first innings with Australia at 3/166 on the first afternoon after electing to bat. Bedser bowled three consecutive outswingers; the fourth ball swung the other way, and Miller was hit on the pads not offering a shot, believing that the ball would have curved away past the stumps. The umpire upheld England's appeal for leg before wicket (lbw) and Miller was out for four. O'Reilly blamed Miller's poor form with the bat on an excessive bowling workload imposed on him by Bradman. Australia made 350, but suffered a blow when Lindwall's injury flared up in the first over; Lindwall played on through the pain. Bradman threw Miller the ball, hoping that the all rounder would reverse his decision not to bowl and take inspiration from Lindwall. The injured bowler returned the ball, citing his back. His gesture generated news headlines among journalists who believed that he had disobeyed Bradman.

Although Bradman claimed that the exchange had been amicable, others disputed this. Teammate Barnes later claimed that Miller had responded to Bradman that he—a very occasional slower bowler—bowl himself. Barnes said that the captain "was as wild as a battery-stung brumby" and warned his unwilling bowler that there would be consequences for his defiance. In unpublished writings in his personal collection, Fingleton recorded that Bradman chastised his players in the dressing room at the end of the play, saying "I'm 40 and I can do my full day's work in the field." According to Fingleton, Miller snapped in reply: "So would I—if I had fibrositis".

England fell to 4/46 after Lindwall and Johnston's new ball burst, but Compton and Yardley fought back to take the score to 133 without further loss. Compton edged Johnston into the slips, where Miller took a low catch, dismissing the batsman for 53. Soon after, Johnston removed Evans for nine, caught by a diving Miller after lashing out at a wide ball outside off stump to leave the hosts at 7/145.

Australia bowled England out for 215 at the beginning of the third day to take a 135-run first innings lead. This had increased to 431 when Miller came to the crease with the score at 3/296 during the afternoon. English captain Yardley was on a hat-trick, having removed Hassett first ball after the fall of Barnes. Miller survived a loud lbw appeal on the hat-trick ball before hitting a six into the grandstand and reaching stumps on 22, with Australia at 4/329. He resumed on the fourth morning and reached lunch on 63 with the tourists at 4/409. Miller was reprieved when Tom Dollery dropped a catch from a ball he skied into the air. When the new ball was taken, and Miller hit three boundaries to pass 50, to lift the run rate. Miller repeatedly hooked Coxon and drove Bedser for many runs. After lunch, he hit out at every opportunity before the declaration. He was out for 74, playing a hook shot that was caught by Bedser at square leg from the bowling of Laker. Australia declared at 7/460 to set England a target of 596.

England reached 3/106 by stumps on the fourth day, but the final day started poorly when Compton edged the second ball of the day—bowled by Johnston—to a diving Miller at second slip; he knocked the ball upwards before falling on his back and completing the catch as the ball went down. Just as in the first innings, Compton's dismissal precipitated a collapse, and Australia dismissed England for 186 to complete victory by 409 runs.

After the end of the Lord's Test, Miller attended a concert and party, before returning to the team hotel after dawn the next morning, just before breakfast. Bradman noticed this and addressed him as "Keith", rather than his nickname "Nugget". Australia was due to play Surrey at The Oval on the same day. Bradman won the toss and elected to field. Instead of deploying him to his usual slips position, the Australian skipper sent Miller to field on the fine leg boundary as a punishment for his late night out. Between overs, the banished player had to walk to the opposite end of the ground to be in position for the bowler from the other end. One of the spectators felt sorry for him and lent his bicycle, which the Australian used to cycle around the edge of the ground between overs. Soon after, Bradman brought his all rounder into a fielding position closer to the centre. Miller eventually scored nine in his only innings and was asked to bowl just one over in the second innings, as Australia completed victory by ten wickets. He had a quiet period on the field during July; his cricket generated fewer media stories than his celebrity appearances at social functions and classical music concerts during this time. The match against Surrey was immediately followed by a match against Gloucestershire in Bristol, where Miller scored 51, featuring in a partnership of 136 with Morris (290). Australia piled on 7/774 declared, its largest score of the season, before proceeding to victory by an innings and 363 runs. Acting captain Hassett allowed Miller to rest and he did not bowl during the match.

Third Test

The England selectors dropped Hutton for the third Test, held  at Old Trafford, largely because of his struggles against Miller and Lindwall. The Australians considered this a blunder, as they rated Hutton to be England's best batsman.

Miller had a quiet match. He did not bowl in the first innings as England batted first and posted 363. The closest he came to a catch was when Yardley edged to him in slips on the half-volley. When Australia batted, he came to the crease and joined Morris with the score at 3/82 and the pair took the score to 3/126 at stumps on the second day. He was on 23 and Morris had made 48. The run rate picked up in the last 50 minutes of the day as the pair added 44 runs; Miller was the more attacking of the Australian duo during this time. The next day, Australia struggled against the new ball in the first hour. Miller was beaten three times in one Bedser over before Dick Pollard trapped him for 31, prompting a middle-order collapse of 3/37, before the tourists recovered to end at 221, avoiding the follow on by eight runs.

Miller returned to the bowling crease in England's second innings. He immediately broke through Washbrook's defences, only to see the ball graze the stumps without dislodging the bails. After two Miller outswingers had evaded the outside edge of Washbrook, the batsman appeared unsettled. One bouncer was hit over square leg in an uncontrolled manner for a four, and another flew in the air, narrowly evading Loxton at fine leg. However, Miller did not take a wicket and ended with 0/15 from 14 overs, but again caught Compton. Not for the first time during the season, the Australian paceman riled the crowd when he launched a series of short-pitched balls at Edrich, apparently in retaliation for the Englishman's bouncing of Lindwall. The paceman struck Edrich on the body before Bradman intervened and ordered him to stop his short-pitched barrage. In another incident, Miller was playing poker with the Englishmen during a rain delay. When the weather cleared, Hassett beckoned him to return to the field for the resumption. Miller ignored him and the poker match continued against the English players who were not currently batting. He won the pot and pocketed the money, before hurriedly running onto the ground late. When he was on the field and approaching the centre, Miller pulled the money out of his pockets. He brandished the notes to the crowd and taunted his English colleagues. The match ended in a draw after the entire fourth day and half of the fifth day was washed out. England declared upon the resumption of play on the final day and set Australia a target of 317 for victory. The tourists reached 1/92 to ensure a draw.

Between Tests, Australia had one tour match against Middlesex at Lord's. Bradman rested Miller as Australia won by ten wickets, giving him an eight-day break between the Tests.

Fourth Test

The teams moved to Headingley for the Fourth Test at Leeds. Hutton was recalled and the home team won the toss and batted first. England tallied 496, its highest score of the series. Miller took the last wicket of Yardley to finish with 1/43. Generally unthreatening throughout the innings, he bowled only 17.1 overs; the other frontline bowlers sent down at least 33 each. The innings started badly for Miller. He bowled below his full pace and his opening over yielded three full tosses. In Miller's first over, Hutton scored the first boundary of the day, driving past mid-off. He felt his legs for muscle strains, and after two overs that O'Reilly described as "very innocuous", Miller was taken off. Nursing fitness concerns, Miller was forced to bowl medium-paced off breaks on the second day as England proceeded to 2/423 and appeared to be in complete control, before losing 8/73. In reply, Australia was struggling at 3/68 on the third morning. Neil Harvey—playing his first Ashes Test—joined Miller at the crease. Both had walked out in the same over, as Pollard removed Bradman and Hassett in the space of three balls. Australia was more than 400 behind, and if England were to remove the pair quickly, they would expose Australia's lower order and give themselves an opportunity to win by taking a hefty first innings lead. Harvey asked his senior partner "What’s going on here, eh? Let's get stuck into 'em". The pair launched a counterattack, with Miller taking the lead. He hoisted Laker's first ball over square leg for six. Miller shielded the left-handed Harvey from Laker, as his partner was struggling against the off breaks that were turning away from him, especially one that spun, bounced, and beat his outside edge. The all rounder drilled one off-drive from Laker for four, and after mis-hitting the next to the amusement of the crowd, struck the off spinner flat over his head, almost for six into the sightscreen. This allowed Australia to seize the initiative, and Harvey joined in during the next over. The left-hander hit consecutive boundaries against Laker, the second of which almost cleared the playing area. He followed this with another boundary to reach 44. Miller then lifted Laker for a six over long off, hitting a spectator in the head, and another over long on from Yardley's bowling to move from 42 to 54. He drove the next ball through cover for four. Yardley responded by stacking his leg side with outfielders and bowling outside leg stump, challenging Miller to another hit for six. The batsman attempted to oblige, but insteadedged the ball onto wicket-keeper Evans' head; Edrich dived forward and caught the ball on the rebound at short fine leg. The crowd was in raptures at both the batting and Edrich's catch.

The partnership had yielded 121 runs in only 90 minutes, and Wisden likened it to a "hurricane". Cricket commentator John Arlott described the innings as the most memorable that he had witnessed. He said "Miller played like an emperor...Every stroke would have been memorable but each one had bettered its predecessor", saying that his batting had raised cricket "to a point of aesthetic beauty". Fingleton said that he had never "known a more enjoyable hour" of "delectable cricket". He acclaimed Miller's innings as "one of the rarest gems in the Test collection of all time" and "a moment to live in the cricket memory". O'Reilly said that Miller and Harvey had counter-attacked with "such joyful abandon that it would have been difficult, if not absolutely impossible, to gather from their methods of going about it that they were actually retrieving a tremendously difficult situation".

The momentum swung in Australia's favour. Harvey scored 112, while Loxton made 93, hitting a further five sixes from Laker. Lindwall added 77 late in the afternoon as Australia finished at 9/457 on the fourth day, having added 394 in one day's play. At the start of the second innings, Miller bowled a tight opening spell and the English openers scored only five from his six overs as they tried to establish a solid start. Miller took 1/53 in the second innings, removing Bedser and catching Compton yet again as Australia was set a world record chase of 404 on the final day in just 345 minutes. A 301-run second wicket partnership between Morris and Bradman set up the run-chase and Miller came in with the score at 2/358. He made only 12 but Australia won by seven wickets to set a new world record and take a 3–0 series lead.

The day after the Test, the Australians moved onto their next match against Derbyshire, where Miller scored 57 and took 3/31 in the first innings but bowled only two overs as Australia won by an innings. In a rain-affected draw against Glamorgan, Miller took 2/41 in the hosts' first innings of 197 before compiling a hard-hitting 84. Coming in to join Hassett with the score at 2/67, he struck five sixes and seven fours. He hit one of the sixes with one hand, sending it 20 rows into the crowd. Miller also attacked the Glamorgan captain Wilf Wooller, hitting him over the sightscreen with straight drives from consecutive balls and lofting a third six over long off. He was finally dismissed while attempting another six; Australia's first innings was washed out at 3/215.

Miller was rested for the nine-wicket win against Warwickshire. He returned against Lancashire. On the final day, Lancashire batsman Jack Ikin had reached 99 after being repeatedly hit by bouncers. Bradman took the new ball and gave it to Miller, who refused to bowl, saying that he felt Ikin deserved a century. The Australian skipper gave the ball to Lindwall, who promptly removed Ikin for 99. Miller had a light workload for the match, scoring 24 and 11, and taking a total of 1/32 from 16 overs. In the next game, he came in with Australia in difficulty at 5/133, and scored 55 in faster than even time against Durham in the last match before the Fifth Test. The match was a two-day fixture that was not given first-class status. Miller took 1/17 as the hosts fell to 5/73 in reply to Australia's 282 when rain ended the match at the end of the opening day.

Fifth Test

The teams proceeded to The Oval for the Fifth Test. England elected to bat on a rain-affected pitch. Dewes and Hutton opened for England. Dewes took a single from Lindwall's opening over and thus faced the start of the second over, which was bowled by Miller, who had troubled him in the past and dismissed him several times. During his short innings, Dewes was visibly nervous and kept on moving around, unable to stand still. Miller caused a stoppage after his first ball to sprinkle sawdust on the slippery and damp crease. With his second ball, he bowled Dewes—who was playing across the line—middle stump for one with an inswinger to leave England at 1/2. He then removed Jack Crapp caught behind from an outside edge for a 23-ball duck, leaving England at 4/23 as play was adjourned for lunch. The paceman ended with 2/5 from eight overs; Lindwall took 6/20 and England were all out for 52. In his last Test innings for the summer, Miller scored five before overbalancing and being stumped. Australia made 389 and led by 337 on the first innings on the second afternoon. Bowling for the second time, Miller struck Crapp in the head with a bouncer, before bowling him for nine. He then extracted an edge from Hutton—who fell for 64, having top-scored in both innings—to wicket-keeper Tallon, leaving England at 4/153. Miller ended with 2/22 as Australia won by an innings and took a 4–0 series win.

Later tour matches
Seven matches remained after the Test series was concluded. Miller was rested for the innings victory over Kent, but played against the Gentlemen of England at Lord's against an amateur team with many Test players. He scored 69, putting on 157 with Hassett, before being dismissed after attempting a third consecutive hooked boundary. Australia declared at 5/610 and Miller took a match total of 3/76 in another innings victory, including the wickets of Yardley and Martin Donnelly. In the following match against Somerset, Miller had a light workload, scoring an unbeaten 37 at No. 8 as Australia made 5/560 declared, and then bowling only eight overs and taking one wicket as Australia claimed victory by an innings and 374 runs after bowling out the hosts for 115 and 71. He was rested from the match against South of England, which ended in a rain-affected draw.

Australia's biggest challenge after the Test series came against the Leveson Gower's XI. During the last Australian tour in 1938, this team was effectively a full-strength England eleven; for this tour, Bradman insisted that no more than six current Test players be allowed to represent for the hosts. The Australian skipper then fielded a full-strength team. Miller returned for this match, held at Scarborough, but did little, scoring one in his only innings and bowling eight overs without success in a match that ended in a rain-affected draw.

This left only two non-first-class matches against Scotland to complete the tour. Miller played in the first game and scored six in his only innings and did not take a wicket, before being rested for the second match. Australia won both matches by an innings. As a result, Australia finished the tour with 25 wins and nine draws. They had gone through the summer without defeat.

When asked about the three most beautiful things in England, Miller said "The hills of Derbyshire, the leg sweep of Denis Compton and Princess Margaret". Having already gained a high profile in England during the Victory Tests of 1945 and possessing good looks, he was a popular celebrity throughout the country. In 1948, he was sought out for many social functions, such as at music or theatrical performances, and at dinner receptions with members of the Royal Family, peerage and political leaders. His friendship with Princess Margaret—the second daughter of King George VI—was the subject of widespread media speculation as to whether a romantic liaison was involved.

Role
During the tour, Miller generally played in the Tests as an opening bowler alongside Lindwall and as a middle-order batsman, coming in at No. 4 or No. 5. His batting ability was such that he played as a specialist batsman even when he was unable to bowl due to injury, such as during the Second Test. Miller wanted to play purely as a batsman, feeling that the workload of bowling would hinder his run-scoring. However, Bradman was intent on going through the tour undefeated, and utilised his bowling options to the full, to maximise the Australians’ chances of winning. Lindwall and Miller were the first-choice pace duo, regarded as one of the greatest speed pairings in the history of cricket, whereas the latter was just one of many accomplished batsmen in the team. As a result, the Australian skipper valued Miller more as an opening bowler. He ended the Tests with 184 runs at 26.28 and 13 wickets at 23.15 from 138.1 overs and took eight catches.

During the Tests, Miller usually batted at No. 5, except in the Fourth Test when he batted at No. 4 due to the injury-enforced absence of opener Barnes, which resulted in a reshuffle in the batting order. Miller totalled 1,088 first-class runs for the tour, the seventh highest aggregate, although his average of 47.30 was only the eighth highest in the squad. During the tour matches, he batted in a variety of positions, as did all of the squad, because Bradman used a rotation system to rest his team because many matches were played consecutively.

When fit, Miller opened the Test bowling with Lindwall, and the pair bowled in short and fiery bursts with the new ball. The English cricket authorities had agreed to make a new ball available every 55 overs. The pre-existing rule stipulated that a replacement ball would be available every 200 runs, which usually took much more time to accumulate. This played directly into the hands of the Australians with their vastly stronger pace attack, as a new ball is ideal for fast bowling. Bradman thus wanted to preserve his two first-choice bowlers for a fresh attack every 55 overs. With 13 wickets in the Tests, Miller was third among the Australians behind Lindwall and Johnston, who took 27 apiece. Owing to his fragility, Miller was used sparingly compared to the other four Australian frontline bowlers: Toshack and Johnson each delivered more than 170 overs despite playing in one less Test, while Lindwall bowled 224 and Johnston 306 in five matches. In all first-class matches, Miller took 56 wickets at 17.58 and held onto 20 catches. There were many consecutive matches during the tour with no intervening rest day, so Bradman ensured that his leading pace duo remained fresh for the new ball bursts in the Tests by giving them a smaller proportion of the bowling during the tour matches. During all first-class matches, Johnston bowled 851.1 overs, Johnson 668, Lindwall 573.4 and Toshack 502, while Miller bowled only 429.4 overs. Doug Ring—who was only selected in one Test—bowled 542.4 overs, while all rounders Colin McCool and Loxton bowled 399.4 and 361.2 overs respectively. McCool did not play in any Tests, while Loxton was only entrusted with 63 overs against England. As such, in some tour matches, Miller was not asked to bowl at all, in order to keep him fresh for the Tests.

After the tour, Bradman was full of praise for Miller, although somewhat critical of his aggressive batting, which the Australian captain thought to be reckless:  Bradman criticised Miller's hitting of sixes (26), feeling that his mercurial all rounder lacked restraint and concentration. In contrast, Fingleton praised Miller's attitude to cricket, saying "He is never one to accept runs when they are there for the taking ... I acknowledge myself the supreme believer in Miller as a cricketer. He had given me joy in the game approached by others." With respect to his persistent bouncing of Hutton and Compton, Fingleton said that it was up to England to develop bowlers of express pace—which they lacked at the time—to retaliate against or deter the Australians from pursuing such tactics. Miller's persistent disagreements with Bradman soon caught up with him, despite the latter's retirement after the tour. During Bradman's testimonial match, Miller bowled three consecutive bouncers at his retired captain, dismissing him with the last of these and drawing an angry look. Bradman was one of three members of the national selection panel, and Miller was dropped for the next series against South Africa in 1949–50. Although Bradman denied voting for the omission, most of the players in the team did not believe this.

See also
Keith Miller with the Australian cricket team in England in 1953
Keith Miller with the Australian cricket team in England in 1956

Notes

References

Notes

Keith Miller
The Invincibles (cricket)